Balboa is a district of Panama City, located at the Pacific entrance to the Panama Canal.

History 

The town of Balboa, founded by the United States during the construction of the Panama Canal, was named after Vasco Núñez de Balboa, the Spanish conquistador credited with discovering the Pacific Ocean. The name was suggested to the Panama Canal Zone authorities by the Peruvian ambassador to Panama.  Prior to being drained, filled, and leveled by the United States Army Corps of Engineers, the hilly area north of Panama City was home to a few subsistence ranches and unused marshlands.

The town of Balboa, like most towns in the Canal Zone, was served by Canal Zone Government–operated schools, post office, police and fire stations, commissary, cafeteria, movie theater, service center, bowling alley, and  other recreational facilities and company stores. There were several schools in the area, including Balboa Elementary School, Balboa High School, and the private St. Mary's School. The town was also home to two private banks, a credit union, a Jewish Welfare Board, several Christian denomination churches, civic clubs (such as the Elks Club and the Knights of Columbus), a Masonic Lodge, a YMCA, several historic monuments, and a miniature Statue of Liberty donated by the Boy Scouts of America.

Panama Canal Treaties
Until 1979, when the Canal Zone as a solely US territory was abolished under the terms of the Panama Canal Treaties, the town of Balboa was the administrative center of the Canal Zone, and remained so until midday on December 31, 1999, by which time, according to the Torrijos-Carter Treaties, the Panama Canal and all its assets and territories were fully returned to the Panamanian government.

Panama Canal Administration Building
The Panama Canal Administration Building, the former seat of the Canal Zone Government and Panama Canal Company, is located in Balboa Heights and continues to perform its duties as the main administration building for the agency that runs the Panama Canal — previously the Panama Canal Commission, now the Panama Canal Authority. The building has large murals painted by William B. Van Ingen depicting the construction of the canal.

Balboa Naval Transmitting Station 
A United States Navy  very-low-frequency transmitting station (callsign NBA) near Balboa began service around 1915. It transmitted orders to submerged submarines.

Port of Balboa 
Balboa is the Pacific-side port of the Panama Canal.  The port has a dry dock in Panamax size (even the gates have a construction similar to that of the locks of the Panama canal).  In 2012, Balboa was ranked the busiest container port in Latin America.

Balboa has a multimodal (ship-to-train) terminal, called the Pacific Terminal, connected to Colón by the Panama Canal Railway.  This allows transportation of containers by train across the isthmus.  The railway also runs a passenger service between Panama City and Colón, once a day, each way.

Climate

Current highlights 

Formerly a part of the Canal Zone, Balboa is now part of Panama City's township of Ancón. Since its incorporation into the Republic of Panama, part of Balboa has been developed to enhance the port's capacity and to adapt to private ownership of residences (previously owned by the U.S. Government/Canal Zone Government/Panama Canal Company, and rented to employees thereof) and some small companies and restaurants. The rapid growth of the West-side population of Panama's province has resulted in increased car traffic because one of the only two ways available to cross towards the west side of the country is the Bridge of the Americas, which is an issue being solved by the construction of new streets. Demographic changes resulting from the departure of most of the American population (because of Torrijos-Carter Treaties) brought the closure of related facilities and institutions, such as Balboa High School and some English-language churches, obviously because they were mostly available for Americans.

Sightseeing highlights for anyone visiting Balboa today include the Administration Building, Mi Pueblito Afroantillano, scenic overlook of Ancon Hill (from which a set of locks of the Canal can be seen), monument Homenaje a la Democracia, the Goethals Memorial, the Prado, two handicraft markets, three bed-and-breakfast hotels, and a country store and café near the Administration Building.

The population as of the 1990 census was 1,214.

See also
Naval Base Panama Canal Zone

References

Populated places in Panamá Province
Panama Canal Zone Townships